Boonsom Iamsiri, who boxes as Panomroonglek Kratingdaenggym or Panomroonglek Kaiyanghadaogym, (พนมรุ้งเล็ก กระทิงแดงยิม, พนมรุ้งเล็ก ไก่ย่างห้าดาวยิม; born 17 December 1984 in Buriram Province, Thailand) is a Thai professional boxer and a Muay Thai kickboxer.

Professional career
He started Muay Thai at the age of 10 and has over 200 fights in name "Panomrunglek Kiatmoo 9" (พนมรุ้งเล็ก เกียรติหมู่ 9). In 2005 he won the Flyweight champion of Lumpinee Boxing Stadium, in 2006 the Lumpinee Boxing Stadium fighter of the year, and 2010 won the Junior bantamweight champion of Lumpinee Boxing Stadium. Struggling to find worthy opposition he began splitting his time with boxing. Kratingdaenggym turned professional in August 2004 at Khun Han, Sisaket Province, Thailand. In his debut Kratingdaenggym defeated previously unbeaten Rocky Fuentes on points over six rounds.

On April 7, 2013, he challenge  WBA Bantamweight World title with a Japanese holder Kōki Kameda at Bodymaker Colosseum, Osaka, Japan, he appears to have a good punch and is likely to win.  But when the scores was announced, he is defeated though opinion journalism that he should be the winner.

After that, he continued to Muay Thai and professional boxing alternately. On September 13, 2017 he boxes against Shingo Wake, a Japanese rising boxer in Super bantamweight division at Edion Arena, Osaka, joins the event with Yukinori Oguni vs. Ryosuke Iwasa and Kosei Tanaka vs. Palangpol CP Freshmart. He appears to be TKO (referee stops contest) in the eighth round.

Titles and accomplishments

Muay Thai
Lumpinee Stadium
 2003 Lumpinee Stadium 108 lbs Champion
 2008 Lumpinee Stadium 115 lbs Champion
 2010 Lumpinee Stadium 115 lbs Champion
 2004 Lumpinee Stadium Fighter of the Year

Toyota Marathon
 2002 Toyota Marathon Tournament 115 lbs Winner

Omnoi Stadium
 2003 Isuzu Cup Tournament Winner
Professional Boxing Association of Thailand (PAT) 
 2009 Thailand 115 lbs Champion

Boxing
World Boxing Council
 2006 WBC World Youth Flyweight champion.
 2010 World Boxing Council International Silver Flyweight Title

Muay Thai record

|-  style="background:#FFBBBB;"
| 2018-04-27|| Loss||align=left| Moradokphet PetchyindeeAcdamey ||  True4U Muaymunwansuk Fight ||  Thailand || Decision|| 5 || 3:00
|-  style="background:#CCFFCC;"
| 2018-03-16|| Win ||align=left| VIP Phetmahaprom ||  True4U Muaymunwansuk Fight ||  Thailand || Decision|| 5 || 3:00
|-  style="background:#FFBBBB;"
| 2018-02-02|| Loss||align=left| Kundiew Payapkumpan ||  True4U Muaymunwansuk Fight ||  Thailand || Decision|| 5 || 3:00
|-  style="background:#CCFFCC;"
| 2017-07-23|| Win||align=left| Thepnimit Sitmonchai || Toyota Petchyindee Promotion  ||  Thailand || Decision|| 5 || 3:00
|-  style="background:#FFBBBB;"
| 2017-07-23|| Loss ||align=left| Kengkla Por.Pekko ||  Rangsit Boxing Stadium  ||  Thailand || Decision|| 5 || 3:00
|-  style="background:#CCFFCC;"
| 2017-05-29|| Win ||align=left| Tomas Sor.Chaijarern|| Rajadamnern Stadium || Bangkok, Thailand || Decision|| 5 || 3:00
|-  style="background:#FFBBBB;"
| 2017-03-29|| Loss ||align=left|  Kaotam Lookprabaht  || Rajadamnern Stadium || Bangkok, Thailand || Decision|| 5 || 3:00
|-  style="background:#FFBBBB;"
| 2017-03-03|| Loss ||align=left|  Saksit Tor. Piamsabpetriew  || Rangsit Boxing Stadium  ||  Thailand || Decision|| 5 || 3:00
|-  style="background:#FFBBBB;"
| 2017-02-22|| Loss||align=left| Yardfa R-Airline|| Rajadamnern Stadium || Bangkok, Thailand || Decision|| 5 || 3:00
|-  style="background:#FFBBBB;"
| 2017-01-27|| Loss||align=left| Yardfa R-Airline||  || Kanchanaburi, Thailand || Decision|| 5 || 3:00
|-  style="background:#CCFFCC;"
| 2016-12-07|| Win ||align=left| Tomas Sor.Chaijarern||  || Kanchanaburi, Thailand || Decision|| 5 || 3:00
|-  style="background:#FFBBBB;"
| 2016-09-16|| Loss ||align=left| Petchsongphak Sitjaroensap || Rangsit Boxing Stadium  ||  Thailand || Decision|| 5 || 3:00
|-  style="background:#FFBBBB;"
| 2016-07-10|| Loss ||align=left| Manasak Pinsinchai || Rajadamnern Stadium || Bangkok, Thailand || Decision|| 5 || 3:00
|-  style="background:#CCFFCC;"
| 2016-06-19|| Win ||align=left| Phetsila Chor.Sampinong  || Rangsit Boxing Stadium ||  Thailand || Decision|| 5 || 3:00
|-  style="background:#CCFFCC;"
| 2016-03-17|| Win ||align=left| Saksit Tor. Piamsabpetriew || Rajadamnern Stadium || Bangkok, Thailand || Decision|| 5 || 3:00
|-  style="background:#FFBBBB;"
| 2015-12-25|| Loss ||align=left| Manasak Pinsinchai || Lumpinee Stadium || Bangkok, Thailand || Decision|| 5 || 3:00
|-  style="background:#FFBBBB;"
| 2015-11-20|| Loss ||align=left| Manasak Pinsinchai || Lumpinee Stadium || Bangkok, Thailand || Decision|| 5 || 3:00
|-  style="background:#FFBBBB;"
| 2015-11-05|| Loss ||align=left| Kengkart Por.Pekko || Rajadamnern Stadium || Bangkok, Thailand || Decision|| 5 || 3:00
|-  style="background:#CCFFCC;"
| 2015-09-15|| Win ||align=left| Ployvitaya Moosaphanmai || Lumpinee Stadium || Bangkok, Thailand || Decision|| 5 || 3:00
|-  style="background:#CCFFCC;"
| 2015-08-24|| Win ||align=left| Saksit Tor. Piamsabpetriew || Rajadamnern Stadium || Bangkok, Thailand || Decision|| 5 || 3:00
|-  style="background:#CCFFCC;"
| 2015-05-17|| Loss ||align=left| Kwanphet Sor.Suwanpakdee || Rangsit Boxing Stadium || Thailand || Decision|| 5 || 3:00
|-  style="background:#FFBBBB;"
| 2014-11-25|| Loss ||align=left| Saksit Tor. Piamsabpetriew || Lumpinee Stadium || Bangkok, Thailand || Decision|| 5 || 3:00
|-  style="background:#CCFFCC;"
| 2014-08-06|| Win||align=left| Yodmongkol Muangsima || Rajadamnern Stadium || Bangkok, Thailand || Decision|| 5 || 3:00
|-  style="background:#FFBBBB;"
| 2014-07-01|| Loss ||align=left| Wanchana Aor Boonchuy || Lumpinee Stadium || Bangkok, Thailand || Decision|| 5 || 3:00
|-  style="background:#FFBBBB;"
| 2014-05-09|| Loss||align=left| Petchtaae Petchyindee Academy || Lumpinee Stadium || Bangkok, Thailand || Decision|| 5 || 3:00
|-  style="background:#FFBBBB;"
| 2014-04-01|| Loss||align=left| Petchtaae Petchyindee Academy || Lumpinee Stadium || Bangkok, Thailand || Decision|| 5 || 3:00
|-  style="background:#CCFFCC;"
| 2013-10-22 || Win ||align=left| Wanchana Or Boonchuay ||Lumpinee Stadium || Thailand || Decision|| 5 || 3:00
|-  style="background:#CCFFCC;"
| 2013-07-05 || Win ||align=left| Kwanphet Sor.Suwanpakdee ||Lumpinee Stadium || Thailand || Decision|| 5 || 3:00
|-  style="background:#FFBBBB;"
| 2013-06-28 || Loss||align=left| Yangtone Yodasawintransport ||Lumpinee Stadium || Thailand || TKO (Knees to the Body)|| 4 ||
|-  style="background:#;"
| 2012-11 || ||align=left| Yangtone Yodasawintransport ||Lumpinee Stadium || Thailand || ||  ||
|-  style="background:#FFBBBB;"
| 2012-09-26|| Loss||align=left| Ekmongkol Gaiyanghaadao ||Lumpinee Stadium || Thailand || Decision || 5 || 3:00
|-  style="background:#CCFFCC;"
| 2012-08-21 || Win ||align=left| Saengmorakot Tor Manothammaraksa ||Lumpinee Stadium || Thailand || Decision || 5 || 3:00
|-  style="background:#FFBBBB;"
| 2012-07-11 || Loss ||align=left| Songkom Nayoksanya ||Lumpinee Stadium || Thailand || Decision || 5 || 3:00
|-  style="background:#CCFFCC;"
| 2012 || Win ||align=left| Nattachai Pran26 ||Lumpinee Stadium || Thailand || Decision || 5 || 3:00
|-  style="background:#CCFFCC;"
| 2012-02-24 || Win||align=left| Phetmorakot Petchyindee Academy || Lumpinee Stadium || Bangkok, Thailand || Decision || 5 || 3:00
|-  style="background:#FFBBBB;"
| 2011-11-09 || Loss||align=left| Phetmorakot Petchyindee Academy || Rajadamnern Stadium || Bangkok, Thailand || Decision || 5 || 3:00
|-  style="background:#CCFFCC;"
| 2011-10-07 || Win ||align=left| Pompurn Por Aowtaleebangsen || Lumpinee Stadium || Bangkok, Thailand || Decision || 5 || 3:00
|-  style="background:#c5d2ea;"
| 2011-09-13 || Draw||align=left| Dechsakda Sitsongpeenong || Lumpinee Stadium || Bangkok, Thailand || Decision || 5 || 3:00
|-  style="background:#CCFFCC;"
| ? || Win ||align=left| Nongbeer Choknamwong || Lumpinee Stadium || Bangkok, Thailand || Decision || 5 || 3:00

|-  style="background:#FFBBBB;"
| 2010-10-05 || Loss||align=left| Nuangthep Eminentair || Lumpinee Stadium || Bangkok, Thailand || Decision || 5 || 3:00
|-
! style=background:white colspan=9 |

|-  style="background:#cfc;"
| 2010- || Win ||align=left| Mondam Sor Weerapon || Lumpinee Stadium || Bangkok, Thailand || Decision || 5 || 3:00

|-  style="background:#cfc;"
| 2010-03-05 || Win ||align=left|  Ponsawan Lookprabath || Lumpinee Stadium || Bangkok, Thailand || ||  || 
|-
! style=background:white colspan=9 |
|-  style="background:#CCFFCC;"
| 2009-12-08 || Win ||align=left| Chartchainoi Sor.Prabsochock || Lumpinee Stadium || Bangkok, Thailand || Decision || 5 || 3:00
|-  style="background:#FFBBBB;"
| 2009-10-22 || Loss||align=left| Chatchai Sor Thanayong || Toyota Marathon, Quarter Finals || Thailand || Decision || 5 || 3:00
|-  style="background:#FFBBBB;"
| 2009-08-07 || Loss||align=left| Chartchainoi Sor.Prabsochock || Lumpinee Stadium || Bangkok, Thailand || Decision || 5 || 3:00

|-  style="background:#cfc;"
| 2008-09-19 || Win ||align=left| Nongbeer Choknamwong || Lumpinee Stadium || Bangkok, Thailand || Decision || 5 || 3:00

|-  style="background:#CCFFCC;"
| 2008-03-28 || Win ||align=left| Pongsiri P.K.Saenchaimuaythaigym ||Lumpinee Stadium || Thailand || Decision || 5 || 3:00
|-
! style=background:white colspan=9 |
|-  style="background:#FFBBBB;"
| 2007-07-06 || Loss ||align=left| Petchboonchu FA Group ||Lumpinee Stadium || Thailand || Decision || 5 || 3:00
|-  style="background:#CCFFCC;"
| 2007-01-30 || Win ||align=left| Norasing Lukbanyai ||Lumpinee Stadium || Bangkok, Thailand || Decision || 5 || 3:00
|-  style="background:#CCFFCC;"
| 2004-07-18 || Win ||align=left| Thongchai Tor. Silachai || || Thailand || Decision || 5 || 3:00

|-  style="background:#CCFFCC;"
| 2004-06-04 || Win ||align=left| Wanphichai Kor Bangkruai ||Lumpinee Stadium || Bangkok, Thailand || Decision || 5 || 3:00

|-  style="background:#CCFFCC;"
| 2004- || Win ||align=left| Pinsiam Sor.Amnuaysirichoke||Lumpinee Stadium || Bangkok, Thailand || Decision || 5 || 3:00

|-  style="background:#CCFFCC;"
| 2004-03-02 || Win ||align=left| Wisanlek Sor.Tossapon||Lumpinee Stadium || Bangkok, Thailand || Decision || 5 || 3:00

|-  style="background:#CCFFCC;"
| 2004-02-06 || Win ||align=left| Namsuk Phetsupaphan ||Lumpinee Stadium || Bangkok, Thailand || Decision || 5 || 3:00

|-  style="background:#cfc;"
| 2003-12-26 || Win||align=left| Sitthichai Kiyarat|| Lumpinee Stadium || Bangkok, Thailand || Decision || 5 || 3:00
|-

|-  style="background:#cfc;"
| 2003-11-21 || Win||align=left| Sangyuth Wor.Soonthornnon|| Lumpinee Stadium || Bangkok, Thailand || Decision || 5 || 3:00
|-

|-  style="background:#cfc;"
| 2003-09-14 || Win||align=left| Namsuk Phetsupaphan || Lumpinee Stadium || Bangkok, Thailand || Decision || 5 || 3:00
|-

|-  style="background:#cfc;"
| 2003-08-26 || Win||align=left| Dawprasuk Sasiprapa|| Lumpinee Stadium || Bangkok, Thailand || Decision || 5 || 3:00
|-

! style=background:white colspan=9 |
|-  style="background:#cfc;"
| 2003 || Win||align=left| Wanwiset Lukbanyai || Isuzu Tournament, Final || Bangkok, Thailand || Decision || 5 || 3:00
|-

! style=background:white colspan=9 |
|-  style="background:#c5d2ea;"
| 2003 || Draw||align=left| Wanwiset Lukbanyai || Isuzu Tournament, Final || Bangkok, Thailand || Decision || 5 || 3:00

|-  style="background:#cfc;"
| 2002-07-23 || Win||align=left| Yandang Sakhomsil|| Lumpinee Stadium || Bangkok, Thailand || Decision || 5 || 3:00
|-
|-  style="background:#cfc;"
| 2002-06-11 || Win||align=left| Dejdamrong Sor Amnuaysirichoke|| Lumpinee Stadium || Bangkok, Thailand || Decision || 5 || 3:00

|-  style="background:#cfc;"
| 2002-05-18 || Win||align=left| Dejdamrong Sor Amnuaysirichoke|| Lumpinee Stadium || Bangkok, Thailand || Decision || 5 || 3:00

|-  style="background:#cfc;"
| 2002-03-10 || Win||align=left| Yai Sit Samerchai||  || Buriram province, Thailand || Decision || 5 || 3:00

|-  style="background:#fbb;"
| 2000-12-30 ||Loss||align=left| Rungruanglek Lukprabat || Omnoi Stadium   || Samut Sakhon, Thailand || Decision || 5 || 3:00 
|-
| colspan=9 | Legend:

References

External links
 

1984 births
Living people
Panomroonglek Kratingdaenggym
Bantamweight boxers
Super-bantamweight boxers
Panomroonglek Kratingdaenggym
Panomroonglek Kratingdaenggym